The 2022 Rally Sweden (also known as the Swedish Rally 2022) was a motor racing event for rally cars held over four days between 24 and 27 February 2022. It marked the 69th running of the Rally Sweden, and was the second round of the 2022 World Rally Championship, World Rally Championship-2 and World Rally Championship-3. The 2022 event was based in Umeå, in Västerbotten County.

Elfyn Evans and Scott Martin were the defending rally winners. Their team, Toyota Gazoo Racing WRT, were the defending manufacturers' winners. Mads Østberg and Torstein Eriksen were the defending rally winners in the WRC-2 category, while Jari Huttunen and Mikko Lukka were the defending rally winners in the WRC-3 category.

Kalle Rovanperä and Jonne Halttunen took their third WRC victory. Their team, Toyota Gazoo Racing WRT, successfully defended their title. Andreas Mikkelsen was the winner in the WRC-2 category and Eriksen successfully defended his title. The Finnish crew of Lauri Joona and Mikael Korhonen won the WRC-3 category, while Jon Armstrong and Brian Hoy won the junior class.

Background

Entry list
The following crews are set to enter into the rally. The event will be opened to crews competing in the World Rally Championship, its support categories, the World Rally Championship-2 and World Rally Championship-3, and privateer entries that are not registered to score points in any championship. Eleven crews were entered under Rally1 regulations, as are twenty-four Rally2 crews in the World Rally Championship-2 and eight Rally3 crews in the World Rally Championship-3.

Itinerary
The rally was initially covered  in nineteen special stages, but it was reduced to seventeen in a total of  due to reindeer movements.

All dates and times are CET (UTC+1).

Report

WRC Rally1

Classification

Special stages

Championship standings

WRC-2 Rally2

Classification

Special stages

Championship standings

WRC-3 Rally3

Classification

Special stages

Championship standings

Notes

References

External links
  
 2022 Rally Sweden at eWRC-results.com
 2022 Rally Sweden at rally-maps.com 

2022 in Swedish motorsport
Sweden
February 2022 sports events in Sweden
2022